Llamahuasi (possibly from Quechua llama llama, wasi house, "llama house") is a  mountain in the Vilcabamba mountain range in the Andes of Peru. It is located in the Cusco Region, Anta Province, Limatambo District, and in the Urubamba Province, Ollantaytambo District. Llamahuasi lies southwest of Mount Huayanay and Ocobamba.

References

Mountains of Peru
Mountains of Cusco Region